The 1997 CAF Super Cup was the fifth CAF Super Cup, an annual football match in Africa organized by the Confederation of African Football (CAF), between the winners of the previous season's two CAF club competitions, the African Cup of Champions Clubs and the African Cup Winners' Cup.

The match took place on 14 February 1997, at Cairo International Stadium in Cairo, Egypt, between Egyptian clubs Zamalek, the 1996 African Cup of Champions Clubs winner, and Al Mokawloon Al Arab, the 1996 African Cup Winners' Cup winner. In the Second all-Egyptian CAF Super Cup, and the second time two clubs from the same country participate the same match in CAF Super Cup (after 1994).
Zamalek won the trophy after beating Al Mokawloon Al Arab 4–2 in the penalty shoot-out, with the game ending 0–0.

Teams

Match details

References
 http://www.angelfire.com/ak/EgyptianSports/ZamalekInAfrSuper.html#1997
 http://www.footballdatabase.eu/football.coupe.zamalek.moqaouloun-el-arab.107286.en.html

1997
Super
1997–98 in Egyptian football
CAF Super Cup
CAF Super Cup
Association football penalty shoot-outs